Jones Standards was a short-lived 24-hour music format that was produced by Jones Radio Networks. Its playlist is composed of mostly adult standards from artists such as Frank Sinatra, Barry Manilow, Johnny Mathis, Rod Stewart and a dozen more artists.

Jones Standards was only on the air for eight months: it was launched January 19, 2008 when the network abandoned the franchise rights to Music of Your Life after a dispute with some of its key personnel. It went off the air September 30 of the same year, as Jones Radio Networks was sold off to Triton Media Group's Dial Global division, which will replace the network with America's Best Music, an older, more established adult standards network that dates to the 1980s. Any and all affiliates such as WMBG in Williamsburg, Virginia will be switching over to "America's Best Music" or either of its competitors listed below.

Competitor Networks
Music of Your Life by Planet Halo, Inc.
Timeless by ABC Radio Networks

Radio formats
Defunct radio networks in the United States
Radio stations established in 2008
Radio stations disestablished in 2008
Defunct radio stations in the United States